FC Speranța Crihana Veche was a Moldovan football club based in Crihana Veche, Cahul, Moldova. They spent two seasons in the Divizia Națională, the top division of Moldovan football. The club was dissolved in 2014.

History
In the 2010–2011 season in League team started the season ending position 10 with 34 points to his credit. That season the team had a successful start and later for half the season to lose a bit of ambition Newcomer.
The following season, the team showed a more stable development of experienced players coming due and ambitious National Division. Hope fought until the last step for getting first place but finally gave primacy Sheriff Tiraspol 2.
The team ended the season with 63 points and has promoted to Division ”A” after receiving national license.
Then in 2011–12, FC Speranța Crihana Veche runner-up the "A" Division and promoted to the highest tier of Moldovan football Moldovan National Division.

Honours
Divizia A
Runners-up (1): 2011–12

Managers
 Igor Ursachi (July 8, 2012 – Oct 23, 2012)
 Veaceslav Rusnac (Oct 23, 2012 – Nov 6, 2012)
 Oleg Bejenari (Nov 8, 2012 – June 30, 2013)
 Serghei Dubrovin (Aug 2, 2013 – Aug 27, 2013)
 Sorin Bucuroaia (Aug 27, 2013 – Oct 7, 2013)
 Serghei Dubrovin (Oct 7, 2013–?)

List of seasons

References

External links
 FC Speranța Crihana Veche at DiviziaNationala.com 

Association football clubs established in 2009
Association football clubs disestablished in 2014
FC Speranta Crihana Veche
2009 establishments in Moldova
2014 disestablishments in Moldova
Defunct football clubs in Moldova